"Magazine Madonna" is a song by Australian band Sherbet, released in May 1977 as the lead single from the band's sixth studio album, Photoplay The song peaked at number 2 in Australia.

Track listing

Charts

Weekly charts

Year-end charts

References 

Sherbet (band) songs
1977 singles
1977 songs
Songs written by Tony Mitchell (musician)
Song recordings produced by Richard Lush
Epic Records singles